John Joseph McCarthy (January 7, 1910 – September 13, 1973) was an American professional baseball first baseman.

He helped the Giants win the 1937 National League pennant as their regular first baseman. His 65 runs batted in were third on the team. In the 1937 World Series, McCarthy started all five games against the cross-town New York Yankees and collected four hits, including a double, in 19 at bats (.211). The Yankees won the Series, four games to one.

In his 11 MLB seasons, McCarthy played in 542 games and had 1,557 at-bats, 182 runs, 432 hits, 72 doubles, 16 triples, 25 home runs, 209 RBI, 8 stolen bases, 90 walks, .277 batting average, .319 on-base percentage, .392 slugging percentage, 611 total bases and 19 sacrifice hits. Defensively, he recorded a .990 fielding percentage as a first baseman.

He died in Mundelein, Illinois at the age of 63.

References

External links

1910 births
1973 deaths
Baseball players from Illinois
Brooklyn Dodgers players
New York Giants (NL) players
Boston Braves players
Major League Baseball first basemen
Dayton Ducks players
Sacramento Senators players
Reading Brooks players
Allentown Brooks players
Newark Bears (IL) players
Jersey City Giants players
Indianapolis Indians players
Minneapolis Millers (baseball) players